Jeff Tittel is an American environmentalist. He has been the director of the New Jersey Sierra Club for 23 years. He is one of the most prominent environmental activists in the state.

Tittel worked on the New Jersey Highlands Act, the New Jersey Clean Car program, a fracking ban in the basin of the Delaware River, and the Global Warming Response Act. He was raised in Hillside, New Jersey and has led environmental activism since an early age.

References

External links

Activists from New Jersey
American environmentalists
Living people
Year of birth missing (living people)
People from Hillside, New Jersey
Sierra Club directors